"No Shoes, No Shirt, No Problems" is a song written by Casey Beathard and recorded by American country music singer Kenny Chesney. It was released in May 2003 as the fifth and final single from his album of the same name. The song peaked at number 2 on the Billboard Hot Country Singles & Tracks chart in August 2003, behind Alan Jackson and Jimmy Buffett's "It's Five O'Clock Somewhere".

Content
The protagonist is being run ragged by his job and fantasizes about going to a tropical place where there's "No boss, no clock, no stress, and no dress code".

Music video
The music video was directed by Shaun Silva, and premiered on CMT on May 30, 2003, during CMT's "Smash Hits of Country".

Chart positions
"No Shoes, No Shirt, No Problems" debuted at number 57 on the U.S. Billboard Hot Country Songs chart for the week of May 24, 2003.

Year-end charts

Certifications

References

2003 singles
2002 songs
Kenny Chesney songs
Songs written by Casey Beathard
Music videos directed by Shaun Silva
Song recordings produced by Buddy Cannon
Song recordings produced by Norro Wilson
BNA Records singles